Mareng is a boma in Anyidi payam, Bor East County, Jonglei State, South Sudan, about 25 kilometers east of Bor.

Demographics
According to the Fifth Population and Housing Census of Sudan, conducted in April 2008, Mareng boma had a population of 10,606 people, composed of 5,560 male and 5,046 female residents.

Notes

References 

Populated places in Jonglei State